Think the Unthinkable is an audience sitcom about hapless management consultants, written by James Cary and first broadcast on BBC Radio 4 in 2001. It starred Marcus Brigstocke, David Mitchell, Catherine Shepherd, Emma Kennedy and Beth Chalmers. Each week the team of consultants inflict their unique brand of help on unsuspecting companies. It won a Silver Sony Award for Comedy in 2002 for the first episode. It is produced by Adam Bromley.

Cast
Ryan Packer (Marcus Brigstocke): The keen and enthusiastic team leader, utterly clueless, and given to overblown metaphors. A running gag is that he usually describes the consultancy process with a metaphor that leads to an inadvertent insult to himself (for example: "Imagine you are square pegs and we are round holes. Try to think of me as a round hole"). Ryan is almost completely oblivious to any hostility in the people he meets, and always assumes the best about everyone. Despite this relentlessly positive outlook rarely working out, he claims to have only ever been depressed once in his life.
Sophie Stott (Emma Kennedy series 1–2, Beth Chalmers series 3–4): Sophie has a direct and no-nonsense approach to most problems, and is probably sociopathic. She has little patience for anyone else in the team, and enjoys firing people. She would probably be the closest the team has to a normal person were it not for her violent temper and extreme mood swings, and often acts as the voice of reason in the group, although her suggestions are usually ignored or overruled, triggering another aggressive phase.
Daisy de Vere (Catherine Shepherd): Relentlessly nice and deeply naïve, Daisy is the team conscience, or would be if anyone listened to her. Daisy is not very bright and may never have fully recovered from the time she fell off a pony, whilst on holiday in Cornwall.
Owen (David Mitchell): The team's technical expert, and Sophie's stalker. Owen is fond of online wargames, cracking computers systems, and video nasties. He is basically immoral and creepy, and relentlessly critical of all existing IT systems, mostly describing them as "pump". His catchphrase is "Alright, losers!" Owen was originally a freelance IT specialist who the team hired for one episode in Series 1, but he had joined Unthinkable Solutions full-time by Series 2.
Jed: (Robin Ince) A fellow member of Owen's online Fraternity of the Sacred Goat, Jed joined the team for the latter part of series 3 after Owen was forced into hiding. (The real reason for this is that David Mitchell was unavailable for the recording dates, as he was filming Peep Show for Channel 4.) Just as Owen was keen on pornographic films, Jed was very keen on obscure low-budget sci-fi and horror movies, which he frequently quotes and refers to.  Like Owen he has his own greeting catchphrase – "Alright, tosspots!"
The Sacred Goat: Along with Owen and Jed, two further members of their online fraternity have appeared in the series: "Clanger" (so called because he's considered the socially awkward one) in the Iota Credit campaign, and Colin who works in Barrington hospital. Other known members include "Gandalf", "The Mole" and "Captain Puke".

April 2006 saw a repeat of series 3 in Tuesday's 6:30pm slot on BBC Radio 4.
April 2007 saw a repeat of Think the Unthinkable, starting at series 1 on BBC7.
Series 1 of Think the Unthinkable was released on CD by BBC Audio in February 2008.

The show also featured other comic actors playing various roles, including Greg Proops (who played Chip in the first episode of series 2), Simon Greenall and Olivia Colman.

Episode lists

External links

BBC Radio comedy programmes
2001 radio programme debuts
2005 radio programme endings